Alūksne) is a town on the shores of Lake Alūksne in northeastern Latvia near the borders with Estonia and Russia. It is the seat of Alūksne municipality. Alūksne is the highest elevated Latvian city, located in East Vidzeme Upland at 217 m above sea level. The high elevation of the city affects the social and physical arrangement of the place.

History 

The region around Lake Alūksne was originally settled by Finnic-speaking tribes, and from the 8th-12th centuries by Latgalians. The date of settlement at the current location of the town, then known as Olysta, Alyst, and Volyst, is given in the chronicles of Pskov as 1284. The later name "Alūksne" comes from the Latgalian word olūksna, meaning a spring in the forest. 

The Latgalian inhabitants of the settlement were conquered by the German crusaders of the Livonian Order in 1224. They built in 1284 a wooden castle named Marienburg (after Mary, the mother of Jesus) on a nearby island, which served to protect trade routes from Riga to Pskov. The town which developed near the castle also became known as Marienburg. In 1342 new castle from stone was built on the largest isle of Lake Alūksne.

Marienburg was captured by the troops of Ivan IV of Russia in 1560 during the Livonian War. It was incorporated into the Polish–Lithuanian Commonwealth in 1582. The town became part of the Swedish Empire in 1629.

Ernst Glück, a Lutheran clergyman and the first translator of the Bible into Latvian, founded the first Latvian language schools in Vidzeme in 1683. It is now the Ernst Glück Bible Museum. The Russian army led by Sheremetyev captured the town during the Great Northern War in 1702, doing great damage to the area and deporting all the inhabitants, including Glück and his foster daughter, Marta Skavronska, who later became Empress Catherine I of Russia.
After 1721 Alūksne became part of the Livonia Governorate but for many decades it was a devastated and minor settlement. Alūksne started development in the 19th century when it became a major trading centre. Further development was stimulated with the opening of narrow gauge railway line Stukmaņi-Gulbene-Alūksne-Valka in 1903.

During the Latvian War of Independence Alūksne was one of the first major settlements in Vidzeme which was liberated by Latvian Army in May 1919.
In 1920 Alūksne was granted town rights. Since 2009 it is an administrative center of the Alūksne municipality. During World War II, Alūksne was under German occupation from 5 July 1941 until 19 August 1944.

The town's island is known as Pils salas (Castle Island) and Maria Island. Alūksne Castle is now used as an open-air theater.

Nature

Alūksne lake 
Alūksne is located on the shore of Lake Alūksne, which is the eleventh largest lake in Latvia. There are four islands in the lake - Cepurītes or Love Island, Long Island, Tīklu Island and Castle Island. The average depth of the lake is about 7 meters. The deepest place reaches up to 20 meters.

Climate

Sister cities
 Joniškis, Lithuania

Gallery

References

External links

 
Towns in Latvia
1920 establishments in Latvia
Castles of the Teutonic Knights
Kreis Walk
Alūksne Municipality